Eastern Finnmark Police District was one of 27 police districts in Norway, covering the eastern part of Finnmark. The district is headquartered in Kirkenes and consists of three police stations, at Kirkenes, Vadsø and Vardø, and five sheriff's offices. The district is led by Chief of Police Ellen Katrine Hætta. Specifically the police district covers the municipalities of Vardø, Vadsø, Karasjok, Lebesby, Gamvik, Berlevåg, Tana, Nesseby, Båtsfjord, Sør-Varanger. As of 2011 the district had 165 employees. It has a special responsibility for the Norway–Russia border control at Storskog and the Reindeer Police. The police district was created in 2003 as a merger between the former Sør-Varanger Police District, Vadsø Police District and Vardø Police District.

References

Police districts in Norway
Organisations based in Finnmark
2003 establishments in Norway
Government agencies established in 2003
Sør-Varanger